The European Law Students' Association (ELSA) is an international, independent, non-political, non-profit, non-governmental organisation run by and for law students. ELSA-activities comprise a large variety of academic and professional events that are organised to fulfill the stated vision of ELSA.

History
Five law students from Austria, Hungary, Poland and West Germany founded ELSA on 4 May 1981.

Organization
ELSA is organized into local member groups active at university level (Local Group), national member groups active on a national level (National Group), and ELSA International active on an international level.

Membership of ELSA for individual law students is possible through the Local Groups (for instance ELSA Leiden or ELSA Tilburg). The Local Groups are member of a National Group (for instance ELSA the Netherlands). The National Groups are part of the international ELSA network, which is managed by ELSA International with headquarters in Brussels, Belgium. ELSA International consists of the International Board, the ELSA International Team, and the Auditors of ELSA.

The International Board is the supreme executive body of the association. Its members are elected at an International Council Meeting (ICM) (which consists of all the National Groups) for a one-year period. The International Board's responsibilities include the overall co-ordination of the organisation as a whole including the support of member groups both locally and nationally. The International Board also co-ordinates and develops ELSA's collaboration with various international organisations and institutions, governments, law firms, and companies across Europe.

Institutional relations
ELSA has gained consultative status with several United Nations bodies. In 1994, ELSA was granted Consultative Status in Category C in UNESCO (United Nations Educational, Scientific and Cultural Organization), and in 1997 ELSA obtained Special Consultative Status with ECOSOC (United Nations Economic and Social Council). In addition UNCITRAL (United Nations Commission on International Trade Law) is inviting ELSA delegations to participate in their sessions.

ELSA was part of the Diplomatic Conference of 1998 in Rome where the Rome Statute of the International Criminal Court was adopted to establish the International Criminal Court. ELSA participated with a delegation as an NGO represented by an observer.

In 2000, ELSA was granted Participatory Status with the Council of Europe. This cooperation was further widened with the signing of a Human Rights Partnership between Council of Europe and ELSA in 2008.

Furthermore, ELSA has a co-operation agreement with UNHCR (United Nations High Commissioner for Refugees). In October 2005, ELSA obtained Observer Status with WIPO (World Intellectual Property Organization).

Since 2002, ELSA organizes the John H. Jackson Moot Court Competition (formerly known as ELSA Moot Court Competition) with the support of the WTO. The final round is held at the WTO headquarters in Geneva, Switzerland. Since 2012, it organizes the European Human Rights Moot Court Competition in cooperation with the Council of Europe; the final round is held onsite at the European Court of Human Rights in Strasbourg.

ELSA Network
ELSA has members and observers in Albania, Armenia, Austria, Azerbaijan, Belarus, Belgium, Bosnia and Herzegovina, Bulgaria, Croatia, Cyprus, Czech Republic, Denmark, Estonia, Finland, France, Georgia, Germany, Greece, Hungary, Ireland, Italy, Iceland, Latvia, Lithuania, Luxembourg, Macedonia, Malta, Moldova, Montenegro, the Netherlands, Norway, Poland, Portugal, Romania, Serbia, Slovak Republic, Slovenia, Spain, Sweden, Switzerland, Turkey, Ukraine and the United Kingdom.

Furthermore, ELSA co-operates with other student organisations across the world, for instance the Asian Law Students' Association (ALSA) in Asia.

See also
 John H. Jackson Moot Court Competition

References

External links
ELSA International
John H. Jackson Moot Court Competition

International organisations based in Belgium
Legal education
Student exchange
European student organizations
Organizations with participatory status with the Council of Europe
Organizations established in 1981
1981 establishments in Belgium